Môtiers was a municipality in the district of Val-de-Travers in the canton of Neuchâtel in Switzerland.  On 1 January 2009, the former municipalities of Boveresse, Buttes, Couvet, Fleurier, Les Bayards, Môtiers, Noiraigue, Saint-Sulpice and Travers merged to form the administrative district of Val-de-Travers.

The old castle, dating in part from the 14th century, stands on a rock spur 1 km due south of the village. Today the property of the canton of Neuchâtel, it is occasionally used to host cultural events.

Absinthe
Since the ban on absinthe was lifted in March 2005, Môtiers has become the focal point of production and promotion of the fée verte. Acknowledging the fact that absinthe was illicitly distilled in the area for generations, the Val de Travers chose Môtiers for the national Maison de l'Absinthe, opened in July 2014, even though neighbouring Couvet claims to be the place where the drink originated.

People
Jean-Jacques Rousseau sought and found protection in Môtiers under George Keith, who was the local representative of the free-thinking Frederick the Great of Prussia. While living in Môtiers, Rousseau was visited by James Boswell (December 1764) and drafted a Constitution for Corsica (Projet de Constitution pour la Corse, 1765). After his house was stoned on the night of 6 September 1765, Rousseau left to seek refuge, first on St. Peter's Island, and then in Great Britain with David Hume, who found lodgings for him at a friend's country estate in Wootton in Staffordshire. Louis Agassiz was born in Môtiers in 1807.

References

Former municipalities of the canton of Neuchâtel